Momtazuddin Ahmed (18 January 1935 – 2 June 2019) was a Bangladeshi playwright-actor and educationist. He was also active in the field of culture, performance, literature and other socio-political activities. His theatre activities were mostly in the field of satire.

Career
Ahmed taught Bengali, Sanskrit, and European drama in several non-government and government colleges for over 32 years. He served as a professor in the department of Bengali, at Jagannath University and a part-time lecturer at the department of Music and Dramatics, at the University of Dhaka.

Ahmed was involved in teaching, writing and acting in his career. He was an activist at the Bengali language movement.

Rabindra Bharati University included his writings  Raja Onushwarer Pala and Ki Chaho Shankhachil in its curriculum. Ahmed was in charge of formulating the national curriculum and text books from 1976 to 1978.

Ahmed was a director of the Department of Research and Publications at Bangladesh Shilpakala Academy during 1977–1980. Later, he served the Bangladesh Permanent Mission to the United Nations as cultural minister.

Ahmed died on 2 June 2019 in Dhaka at the age of 84. He was buried at his ancestral home at Bholahat Upazila in Chapai Nawabganj District.

Work
Ahmed wrote 25 plays for stage, radio and television and directed several of them. Most of his directions and writings were for his theatre troupe Theatre (Natok Shoroni).
 Ami
 Lalu Shalu Ebong Syed Waliullah
 Ki Chaho Shankhachil
 Raja Anushwarer Pala
Plays
 Shadhinota Amar Shadhinota
 Bokulporer Shadhinota
 Shaat Ghater Kana Kori
 Ohey Tanchak (an adaptation of a Molière satire)
 Khamakha Khamakha (an adaptation of a Shakespeare comedy)
 Barnochora
Others
 Jamidar Darpan (a re-writing of Mir Mosharraf Hossain's play)

Awards
 Bangla Academy Literary Award (1976)
 Ekushey Padak (1997)
 Bangladesh Shilpakala Academy honored him as one of the outstanding playwrights in Bangladesh (2008)
 Alaol Literary Award

References 

1935 births
2019 deaths
People from Chapai Nawabganj district
Bangladeshi male stage actors
Bangladeshi male television actors
Male dramatists and playwrights
Bangladeshi dramatists and playwrights
Bengali-language writers
Bangladeshi male writers
Recipients of the Ekushey Padak
Recipients of Bangla Academy Award
People from Malda district
Bangladeshi people of Indian descent